Bessika Bucktawor (born April 28, 1995) is a Mauritian beauty pageant titleholder who was crowned Miss Mauritius 2016.

Miss Mauritius Competition 2016

References

External links
 

Living people
Mauritian people of Indian descent
1995 births
Mauritian beauty pageant winners
Mauritian Hindus
Mauritian female models
People from Port Louis District